The Apple Design Awards (ADAs) is an event hosted by Apple Inc. at its annual Worldwide Developers Conference. The purpose of the event is to recognize the best and most innovative Macintosh and iOS software and hardware produced by independent developers, as well as the best and most creative uses of Apple's products. The ADAs are awarded in categories that vary each year. The awards have been presented annually since 1997. For the first two years of their existence, they were known as the "Human Interface Design Excellence Awards" (HIDE Awards).

Since 2003, the physical award given to those recognized at the awards event bore an Apple logo that would glow when touched. These were engineered and built by Sparkfactor Design.

Winners

1997

1998

1999

2000

2001

2002

2003

2004

2005

2006

2007

2008

2009

2010

2011

2012

2013

Student Scholarship Design Award Winners
 Louis Harboe
 Bryan Keller
 Puck Meerburg

2014

2015

2016

2017

2018

2019

2020

2021

2022

References

External links

Apple Inc. industrial design
Design awards
Apple Worldwide Developers Conference
Video game awards
Computer-related awards